Alex Junior Nweze (born August 27, 1991) is a Nigerian footballer who plays as a defender for Al-Bahri in the Iraqi Premier League.

Honours

Al-Yarmuk
Yemeni League: 2013.

Al-Mudhaibi
Oman First Division League: 2016–17

References

External links

 Alex Junior Nweze at Footballdatabase

1991 births
Living people
Nigerian footballers
Nigerian expatriate footballers
Association football defenders
Nigeria Professional Football League players
Expatriate footballers in Yemen
Expatriate footballers in Oman
Expatriate footballers in Iraq
Ghanaian expatriates in Oman
Ghanaian expatriates in Iraq
Al Yarmuk Al Rawda players
People from Abuja